Coronelaps is a genus of snake in the family Colubridae  that contains the sole species Coronelaps lepidus. It is also known as the Minas Gerais snake or crowned burrowing snake.

It is endemic to Brazil.

References 

Dipsadinae
Monotypic snake genera
Reptiles of Brazil
Reptiles described in 1861